Oreonectes anophthalmus is a species of ray-finned fish in the family Nemacheilidae. This cavefish is found only in Guangxi and Guizhou in China. It grows to  standard length.

References

anophthalmus
Freshwater fish of China
Endemic fauna of China
Cave fish
Fish described in 1981
Taxonomy articles created by Polbot